is a Japanese manga series written and illustrated by Yoshihiro Takahashi. It was published by Shueisha in Weekly Shōnen Jump from 1983 to 1987, and collected in 18 bound volumes. It received the 1987 Shogakukan Manga Award for best shōnen series. It was licensed in North America in 2020 by Manga Planet.

The series tells the story of an Akita Inu pup called Gin (Japanese for "silver") who leaves his master, a young boy named Daisuke, to join a pack of wild dogs. The pack is gathering strong dogs from all over Japan to fight a deranged bear named Akakabuto (Japanese for "red helmet") and his minions. The story begins from the point of view of the humans, but swings to the dogs afterwards. Takahashi was reportedly inspired by a news article about hunting dogs that had been abandoned by their masters and had begun living as wild animals.

Silver Fang -The Shooting Star Gin- was adapted as a 21-episode anime television series by Toei Animation. In western countries, the anime was released as a set of four VHS tapes, and censored for violent images to make the anime more suitable for younger audiences. This led to the removal of several plot-critical scenes, including all footage from the episodes preceding the series finale as well as the deaths of certain characters. Due to limitations of sound-editing at the time this resulted in the background music of certain scenes to be lost.

The anime has been dubbed in Korean, Thai, Finnish, Hungarian, Danish, Norwegian, and Swedish. In 2003, the uncensored and non-dubbed version of the anime was released in Finland and Sweden as a 5 DVD box set. A corresponding DVD set was released in Denmark and Norway on October 3, 2006, with new dubs in both Danish and Norwegian. The Finnish publisher Punainen jättiläinen is releasing the original 18-volume manga with the first volume published in May 2010. The Ginga: Nagareboshi Gin data book,  was released in September 2011 and after Silver Fang -The Shooting Star Gin- ends, its sequel,  started to be published in December 2011.

The manga has been released for iPhone, iPad and iPod Touch at Apple's iTunes App Store and it is also available in English.

Plot

Media

Manga

|}

Anime
The TV series was produced by TV Asahi and Toei Animation, with Tomoharu Katsumata serving as series director, Mitsuru Majima and Kenji Terada writing the scripts, Jōji Yanase designing the characters and Gorō Oumi composing the music. It was broadcast every Monday from 19:30 to 20:00 (Japan Standard Time) on TV Asahi affiliate stations from April 7 to September 22, 1986, for a total of 21 episodes. The anime adaptation ended with the Akakabuto arc, and the Hakkenshi arc was not produced. In addition, the development of the last half of the story is simplified, with some dogs lacking any lines and their appearances reduced compared to the original manga. Takayuki Miyauchi performed both the opening and ending themes, "Nagareboshi Gin" and "TOMORROW".

Reception
It received the 1987 Shogakukan Manga Award for best shōnen series.

References

External links
 Ginga: Nagareboshi Gin on Toei Animation website
 Stage play Ginga: Nagareboshi Gin - Kizuna-hen
 Stage play Ginga: Nagareboshi Gin - Gajō Kessen-hen
 
 

1986 anime television series debuts
Animated television series about dogs
Comics about dogs
Shōnen manga
Shueisha manga
Toei Animation television
TV Asahi original programming
Winners of the Shogakukan Manga Award for shōnen manga